The Way I'm Livin' is the eighth studio album by American country music recording artist Lee Ann Womack. The album was released via Sugar Hill Records on September 23, 2014. Her first album in six years, following 2008's Call Me Crazy, this album sees Womack embrace roots music and americana alongside neotraditional country rather than the country pop sound that was prevalent in several previous releases.

Production
The Way I'm Livin was recorded and mixed by Chuck Ainlay at Sound Stage Studios in Nashville, Tennessee. Additional recording was done by Brandon Schexnayder and Christian Best at Dogtown Studios in Nashville, and Monique Studios in Cork, Ireland. The album was produced by Chuck Ainlay, Glenn Worf and Womack's husband Frank Liddell.

Critical reception and accolades
{{Album ratings
| MC = 84/100
| rev1 = AllMusic
| rev1Score = <ref name=AllMusic>{{cite web|last=Erlewine|first=Stephen Thomas|author-link=Stephen Thomas Erlewine|title=The Way I'm Livin – Lee Ann Womack|url=http://www.allmusic.com/album/the-way-im-livin-mw0002714370|work=AllMusic|publisher=All Media Network|accessdate=September 24, 2014}}</ref>
| rev2 = American Songwriter
| rev2Score = <ref name="American Songwriter">{{cite web|last=Horowitz|first=Hal|title=Lee Ann Womack: The Way I'm Livin''' |url=http://www.americansongwriter.com/2014/09/lee-ann-womack-way-im-livin/|work=American Songwriter|date=September 23, 2014|publisher=ForASong Media, LLC |issn=0896-8993|accessdate=September 24, 2014}}</ref>
| rev3 = Billboard| rev3Score = 
| rev4 = The Daily Telegraph| rev4Score = 
| rev5 = USA Today| rev5score= 
}}

According to Metacritic, The Way I'm Livin received a weighted average of 84 out of 100, based on 7 mainstream critic reviews, indicating "Universal Acclaim". In his review for USA Today, Brian Mansfield compares the album, which is "rooted in gospel and hymns", to "Dolly Parton's finest". Mansfield noted, "Her run-ins with the devil may seem uncomfortably specific, but the swelling steel guitars carry her as if on angels' wings."

In his review for AllMusic, Stephen Thomas Erlewine observes that The Way I'm Livin' "plays like a classic album: it's a record where the sum is greater than the individual parts". Hal Horowitz, in his review in American Songwriter, writes, "The resulting comeback doesn't always click but when it does, the artist can rebound with some of their best work". Horowitz goes on to write, "This is a triumph for country music that's never musty yet still harkens back to a simpler, less glitzy time when emotions drove songs, not simplistic clichés."

In his review in Billboard magazine, Chuck Dauphin writes, "Was it worth the wait or has Womack stayed away from music-making too long? The answer is a very definitive one, as the Texas native reclaims her spot as one of country's most expressive and distinctive vocalists." Writing for The Daily Telegraph, Martin Chilton writes, "She succeeds admirably with The Way I'm Livin', a moving and powerful set of songs, right from the gorgeous opening prelude Fly ... It's great to have Lee Ann Womack back with such a sad and lovely album, which has an eye-catching cover."

Commercial performance
The album debuted on the Billboard'' 200 at No. 99 and on the Top Country Albums at No. 18, selling 4,300 copies for the week. As of February 2015, the album has sold 14,600 copies in the US.

Track listing

Personnel
Music
 Lee Ann Womack – vocals
 Matt Chamberlain – drums
 Duke Levine – electric guitar, acoustic guitar
 Mac McAnally – acoustic guitar, piano, B–3, Rhodes, keyboards, mandocello
 Glenn Worf – bass, upright bass
 Paul Franklin – steel
 Hank Singer – fiddle, mandolin
 Aubrey Haynie – fiddle
 Kenny Greenberg – additional electric guitars
 Mike Rojas – accordion
 Tom Hambridge – bass drum
 Chris Carmichael – strings

Production
 Frank Liddell – producer
 Chuck Ainlay – producer, recording, mixing
 Glenn Worf – producer
 Brandon Schexnayder – additional recording
 Christian Best – additional recording
 Gavin Lurssen – mastering
 Brittany Hamlin – production coordinator
 John Scarpati – art direction and photography
 Jon Krop – design

Chart performance

References

2014 albums
Lee Ann Womack albums
Sugar Hill Records albums
Albums produced by Chuck Ainlay
Albums produced by Frank Liddell